Tihu (Pron:ˈtɪhuː) is a town and a town area committee established in 1951 in Nalbari district in the Indian state of Assam.

Demographics
 India census, Tihu had a population of 4301. Males constitute 53% of the population and females 47%. Tihu town has an average literacy rate of almost 80 %, much higher than the national average of 59.5%: male literacy is 84%, and female literacy is 79%. In Tihu, 10% of the population is under 6 years of age.

References

Cities and towns in Nalbari district
Nalbari